Per Mats Ola Carlsson (born 28 January 1961) is a Swedish former footballer who most notably played as a right-back for IFK Göteborg.

Club career 
Carlsson helped IFK Göteborg win the 1986–87 UEFA Cup, playing the full 180 minutes as a right-back in the two final games against Dundee United. He was also a part of the IFK Göteborg that won the 1987 Swedish Championship title.

International career 
Carlsson played ten games for the Sweden U21 team between 1985 and 1987.

Career statistics

Club

Honours 
IFK Göteborg
 Swedish Champion: 1987
 UEFA Cup: 1986–87

References 

Living people
1961 births
Association football fullbacks
Swedish footballers
IFK Göteborg players
UEFA Cup winning players